Koh-Lanta: Cambodge is the 17th season of the French version of Survivor, Koh-Lanta. This season takes place in Koh Rong, Cambodia in the same location in which the previous season, Koh-Lanta: L'Île au Trésor was filmed. The main twist this season is instead of having the two traditional tribes, there are three in this season. In addition on day 4, three contestants were added to the game; one for each tribe. The season premiered on 10 March 2017 & concluded on 16 June 2017 where Frédéric Blancher won in a 6-2 jury vote against Clémentine Jullien to be crowned the Sole Survivor.

Contestants

Future appearances 
Clémentine Jullien, Dylan Thiry and Yassin Metiri later returned for Koh-Lanta: Le Combat des Héros. Jullien returned for a third time for Koh-Lanta: La Légende.

Challenges

Voting History

Notes

References

External links

Koh-Lanta seasons
2017 French television seasons
Television shows filmed in Cambodia